The AM-69 Georges Payre, also known as the Arts & Métiers AM-69 and the ENAM-69/70, was a conventionally laid out low wing monoplane designed and built by French students in the early 1970s.  It was intended as a trainer, seating two in tandem.

Design and development

Design of the AM-69 began in 1969 as the name suggests, when a group of twelve students of the school started from the incomplete design of the Gaucher TRG-662, a tandem seat light aircraft. The AM machine was to be a two-seat training aircraft and the design work occupied the students for some 3,000 hours. Its construction, undertaken by another group of ten students took 4,000 hours, with the AM-69 flying on 6 May 1973.  It was named after one of their lecturers.

The prototype AM-69 was an all-wood, low wing cantilever monoplane.  Its wings, skinned with birch plywood had a modified Mureau 234 section with a maximum thickness-to-chord ratio of 13.2%, notable for the large area of both upper and lower surfaces which were flat.  There was dihedral over the whole wing and a full-span combination of inboard flaps and ailerons.

The Georges Payre was powered by a 67 kW (90 hp) Continental C90 air-cooled flat four engine in the nose of its rectangular section, round decked fuselage. Fuel tanks were in the wings. The occupants sat in tandem under a long, framed canopy with individual, starboard-hinged sections for access. Solo control was from the forward seat, over the wing.  The conventional cantilever tail had swept, straight-edged vertical surfaces, with a rudder that extended to the keel and horizontal surfaces mounted at mid-fuselage height forward of the rudder hinge.  The control surfaces were horn balanced and there was a large trim tab on the port elevator.

The AM-69's fixed, conventional undercarriage borrowed heavily from other designs.  The main legs and wheels, mounted onto the front wing spar, were from a Robin DR.220 and the tailwheel was a modified Stampe SV.4 component.

The ENAM students began the design of an all-metal version, with larger tail surfaces and revised canopy and engine cowling, intending it to be homebuilt from plans but nothing seems to have come of this.

Operational history
After its first flight the AM-69 gained its certificate of airworthiness (CoA) in July 1973 and was owned by the Centre Recherche Application des Techniques d'Education Populaire et Sport (CRATEPS) at Montceau-les-Mines for two years, after which the CoA lapsed and the aircraft was eventually removed from the Civil Register.  The airframe was still in storage there in 1995.

Specifications (prototype)

References

1970s French civil trainer aircraft
Single-engined tractor aircraft
Low-wing aircraft
Aircraft first flown in 1973